Admiral Sir John Borlase Warren, 1st Baronet  (2 September 1753 – 27 February 1822) was a British Royal Navy officer, diplomat and politician who sat in the House of Commons between 1774 and 1807.

Naval career
Born in Stapleford, Nottinghamshire, he was the son and heir of John Borlase Warren (died 1763) of Stapleford and Little Marlow. He entered Emmanuel College, Cambridge in 1769, but in 1771 entered the navy as an able seaman; in 1774 he became member of Parliament for Great Marlow; and in 1775 he was created a baronet, the baronetcy held by his ancestors, the Borlases, having become extinct in 1689.
On 12 December 1780, he married Caroline daughter of Lt.-Gen. Sir John Clavering. She died in 1839.

His career as a seaman really began in 1777, and two years later he obtained command of a ship. On 23 April 1794, as Commodore of the frigate squadron off the north-west French coast assisting in the blockade of Brest, Warren and his squadron captured a number of French frigates. In 1795, he commanded one of the two squadrons carrying troops for the Quiberon expedition and in 1796 his frigate squadron off Brest is said to have captured or destroyed 220 vessels. In October 1798, a French fleet—carrying 5,000 men—sailed from Brest intending to invade Ireland. The plan was frustrated in no small part due to the squadron under his command during the action of 12 October 1798 off Donegal.

In 1802, he was sworn of the Privy Council and sent to St. Petersburg as ambassador extraordinary, but he did not forsake the sea. In 1806 he captured a large French warship, the Marengo, at the action of 13 March 1806. He was commander-in-chief on the North American Station from 1807 to 1810. He became an admiral in 1810, and was commander-in-chief on this Station again from 1813 to 1814. While in Halifax he determined the late commander John Shortland's dog had been stolen from London and brought to Halifax. He had the dog returned to London to Shortland's widow. During the British invasion of Maryland in 1814, he led a detail of British troops that occupied Havre de Grace and set fire to much of the town, including the home of Commodore John Rodgers. He died on 27 February 1822. His two sons predeceased him. His daughter and heiress, Frances Maria (1784–1837), married George Venables-Vernon, 4th Baron Vernon. Their son was George Venables-Vernon, 5th Baron Vernon.

There is a monument to him in St Mary's Church, Attenborough in Nottinghamshire. A popular figure in the area of his birth, there are a number of pubs named after him in Nottingham and nearby towns.

Notes

References

 Biography at the Dictionary of Canadian Biography Online

External links 

 

|-

|-

1753 births
1822 deaths
Royal Navy admirals
Royal Navy personnel of the French Revolutionary Wars
People from Stapleford, Nottinghamshire
Alumni of Emmanuel College, Cambridge
Members of the Parliament of Great Britain for English constituencies
Members of the Parliament of the United Kingdom for English constituencies
Baronets in the Baronetage of Great Britain
Knights Grand Cross of the Order of the Bath
Ambassadors of the United Kingdom to Russia
UK MPs 1801–1802
UK MPs 1802–1806
UK MPs 1806–1807
British MPs 1774–1780
British MPs 1780–1784
British MPs 1796–1800
Royal Navy personnel of the Napoleonic Wars